Lawrence Sydney Nicasio (born September 5, 1956, in Dangriga) is a Belizean clergyman and Roman Catholic Bishop in the Roman Catholic Diocese of Belize City-Belmopan.

Life 
Lawrence Nicasio comes from a Garifuna family. He attended Augustine High School in his hometown of Dangriga and graduated from Belize Teachers' College in Belize City. He then taught at various schools and was appointed director of the Catholic schools in the Toledo District. 05/18 / second-garifuna-catholic-bishop-ordained-belize / `` Second Garifuna Catholic Bishop Ordained in Belize '', accessed July 2, 2018. 

In 1981 he began studying philosophy at Cardinal Glennon College in Shrewsbury, Missouri, which was followed by studies at the theology college on the same grounds, Kenrick Theological Seminary, near St. Louis.  On June 16, 1989, he was ordained to the priesthood. He was Vicar in Belmopan for 13 years from 1991 to 2004, pastor in Orange Walk Town, and then pastor of two suburban churches in Belize City: St. Ignatius (2005–2008) and St. John Vianney (2008-2013).

On January 26, 2017, Pope Francis accepted the resignation of Bishop Dorick M. Wright and appointed Nicasio as the new Bishop of Belize City-Belmopan. He received episcopal consecration from the Apostolic Nuncio in Belize, Archbishop Léon Kalenga Badikebele, on May 13, 2017. Co-consecrators were the Archbishop of Nassau, Patrick Christopher Pinder, and Fernand J. Cheri, OFM, Auxiliary Bishop in New Orleans.

Weblinks 
Catholic hierarchy: Bishop Lawrence Sydney Nicasio

References 

1956 births
Living people
21st-century Roman Catholic bishops in Belize
Garifuna people
People from Dangriga
Belizean bishops
Roman Catholic bishops of Belize City–Belmopan